William Forgy McNagny (April 19, 1850 – August 24, 1923) was a U.S. Representative from Indiana. Born in Tallmadge, Ohio, McNagny moved in early life to Whitley County, Indiana. He attended the public schools and Springfield Academy in South Whitley, Indiana. He then taught school while working on his father's farm for six years. From 1868 to 1875, he served as the Larwill, Indiana station agent for the Pennsylvania Railroad.

While working for the railroad, McNagny studied law, was admitted to the bar in 1875, and commenced practice in Columbia City, Indiana as the partner of Thomas R. Marshall.

In 1892, McNagny was elected as a Democrat to the Fifty-third Congress. He served one term, March 4, 1893, to March 3, 1895. In 1894, he was an unsuccessful candidate for reelection to the Fifty-fourth Congress.

After leaving Congress, McNagny resumed the practice of law in Columbia City. He died in Columbia City on August 24, 1923, and was interred in the city's Masonic Cemetery.

References

1850 births
1923 deaths
People from South Whitley, Indiana
Democratic Party members of the United States House of Representatives from Indiana
People from Columbia City, Indiana
Indiana lawyers